Fagus hayatae, also known as Taiwan beech, is a species of beech tree. While IUCN reports it, as endemic to Taiwan, "Flora of China" and "Flora of Taiwan" also report it from China; "Flora of China" reports a wide but discontinuous mainland distribution between Sichuan in the southwest to Zhejiang in the east.

References

hayatae
Trees of China
Trees of Taiwan
Vulnerable plants
Taxonomy articles created by Polbot